Leonel Marcelo Herrera Silva (born August 16, 1971 in Santiago, Chile) is a Chilean former professional footballer who played as a defender for clubs in Chile, Mexico and Switzerland, and politician who is a councillor for the Santiago commune.

Personal life
He is the son of the former Chilean international footballer Leonel Herrera Rojas, who is also the cousin of Eladio Rojas, a historical player at the 1962 FIFA World Cup.

In the 2016 Chilean municipal elections, Herrera was elected as a councillor for the Santiago commune running as an independent supporting the Independent Democratic Union.

Teams
 Colo-Colo 1989
 Deportes Concepción 1990
 Colo-Colo 1991
 Deportes La Serena 1992
 Colo-Colo 1993
 Deportes Antofagasta 1994
 Colo-Colo 1995
 Correcaminos 1996
 Deportes Temuco 1997
 Saint Gallen 1997–1998
 Deportes Iquique 1998
 Palestino 1999–2001
 Audax Italiano 2002

Titles
Colo-Colo
 Chilean Primera División (3): 1989, 1991, 1993

References

External links
 
 Leonel Herrera at playmakerstats.com (English version of ceroacero.es)

1971 births
Living people
Footballers from Santiago
Chilean footballers
Association football defenders
Colo-Colo footballers
Deportes Concepción (Chile) footballers
Deportes La Serena footballers
C.D. Antofagasta footballers
Correcaminos UAT footballers
Deportes Temuco footballers
FC St. Gallen players
Deportes Iquique footballers
Club Deportivo Palestino footballers
Audax Italiano footballers
Chilean Primera División players
Ascenso MX players
Swiss Super League players
Chilean expatriate footballers
Chilean expatriate sportspeople in Mexico
Expatriate footballers in Mexico
Chilean expatriate sportspeople in Switzerland
Expatriate footballers in Switzerland
Politicians from Santiago
Chilean sportsperson-politicians
Independent Democratic Union politicians